The Academy of Canadian Cinema & Television presents an annual award for Best Performance by an Actress in a Leading Role to the best performance by a lead actress in a Canadian film. The award was first presented in 1968 by the Canadian Film Awards, and was presented annually until 1978 with the exception of 1969, when no eligible feature films were submitted for award consideration, and 1974 due to the cancellation of the awards that year.

From 1980 until 2012, the award was presented as part of the Genie Awards ceremony; since 2013, it has been presented as part of the Canadian Screen Awards.

From 1980 to 1983, only Canadian actresses were eligible for the award; non-Canadian actresses appearing in Canadian films were instead considered for the separate Genie Award for Best Performance by a Foreign Actress. After 1983, the latter award was discontinued, and from 1986 both Canadian and foreign actresses were eligible for Best Performance by an Actress in a Leading Role.

In August 2022, the Academy announced that it will discontinue its past practice of presenting gendered awards for film and television actors and actresses; beginning with the 11th Canadian Screen Awards in 2023, gender-neutral awards for Best Performance will be presented, with eight nominees per category instead of five. Lead performances are now honoured with the Canadian Screen Award for Best Lead Performance in a Film.

1960s

1970s

1980s

1990s

2000s

2010s

2020s

See also
Prix Iris for Best Actress

Notes

References

Film awards for lead actress
Actress